Higham is a village and civil parish in the West Suffolk district of Suffolk in the east of England. Located midway between Bury St Edmunds and Newmarket, in 2005 its population was 140. Higham is split into three parts: Upper Green, Middle Green and Lower Green.

Prior to the Beeching Axe, the village was served by Higham railway station. Its church, St Stephen, is one of 38 existing round-tower churches in Suffolk.

Geography
The Broom's Barn Experimental Station is in the village.

References

External links

Website with photos of Higham St Stephen, a round-tower church
Higham village website

Villages in Suffolk
Civil parishes in Suffolk
Forest Heath